The Inn at St. John's is a luxury boutique hotel and golf resort located in the Metro Detroit city of Plymouth, Michigan. The hotel contains the "5ive" restaurant. In addition, the hotel ballroom can accommodate conferences of up to 450 people. The hotel architecture is in the Romanesque Revival style. The resort contains a 27-hole golf course, gardens, recreation facilities, and an indoor swimming pool.

History
The inn, opened in 2006, is privately owned, created by a private investor within larger site of the landmarked former St. John's Provincial Seminary, owned by the Archdiocese of Detroit.
Special events, such as the Concours d'Elegance of America car classic, are held at the resort.

References

External links
 Photos on Flickr of the former St. John's Provincial Seminary now The Inns at St. John's
 The Inn at St. John's website

Hotels in Michigan